Donceel is a municipality of Wallonia located in the province of Liège, Belgium. 

On January 1, 2006, Donceel had a total population of 2,828. The total area is 23.31 km² which gives a population density of 121 inhabitants per km².

The municipality consists of the following districts: Donceel, Haneffe, Jeneffe, and Limont.

Image gallery

See also
 List of protected heritage sites in Donceel

References

External links
 

Municipalities of Liège Province